Key-based routing (KBR) is a lookup method used in conjunction with distributed hash tables (DHTs) and certain other overlay networks. While DHTs provide a method to find a host responsible for a certain piece of data, KBR provides a method to find the closest host for that data, according to some defined metric. This may not necessarily be defined as physical distance, but rather the number of network hops.

Key-based routing networks
 Freenet
 GNUnet
 Kademlia
 Onion routing
 Garlic routing

See also

 Public-key cryptography
 Distributed Hash Table - Overlay Network
 Anonymous P2P

References

Anonymity networks
Routing
File sharing networks
Distributed data storage
Network architecture
Cryptographic protocols
Key-based routing